Badagry Division is an administrative division of Lagos State in Nigeria.

The ancient town of Badagry, also known as Badagri, is located in Nigeria and was one of the five divisions established by the Lagos State in 1968. It has a troubled past and an important present. With a history dating back nearly 593 years, the little coastal town and lagoon port is one of the most significant cities in Nigerian and African colonial history.

History
Badagry Division figures in the history of relations and contact between Nigeria and Europe, as it was a major slave outpost and market prior to British colonization. It was also the place where, in 1842, Christianity was first preached in Nigeria; this was memorialized by the Agia Cenotaph.

Local government areas
It consists of four local government areas:

 Ojo
 Amuwo-Odofin
 Ajeromi-Ifelodun
 Badagry

Major settlements
 Badagry
 Ibereko
 Oke oko
 Ajara
 Ajido
 Akarakumo
 Gbaji
 Aseri 
 Egan
 Aganrin
 Ahanfe
 Epe
 Posi
 Mowo
 Itoga 
 Ebiri
 Ekunpa
 Aradagun
 Berekete
 Mosafejo
 Gayingbo-Topo
 Kankon Moba
 Lopoji/Ropoji
 Oranyan 
 Tafi-Awori
 Yeketome
 Pota
 Seme Border 
 Iyafin
 Farasime
 Mushin

Awori District settlements
In the Awori District are: 
 Awodi-Ora
 Ishasi
 Oto-Awori
 Ijanikin
 Ilogbo
 Oko-Afo
 Sibiri
 Apa
 Idoluwo-ile
 Ado-Soba
 Ibeshe
 Irede
 Irese
 Mebamu
 Itewe 
 Igede 
 Ajangbadi 
 Iyagbe
 Ajegunie
 Aiyetoro
 Festac Town
 Satellite Town
 Iba
 Kirikiri
 Agboju-Amuwo
 Okokomaiko
 Ojo
 Amukoko
 Alaba-Ore
 Ijoiin
 Igbanko
 Imore
 Ijegun
 Mushin
 Isolo
 Ota
Ilemba-Awori
 Itire
 Ipaja
 Agege
 Ibereko

Tourist sites and monuments 

 Agia Cenotaph, Badagry – site where Christianity was first preached in Nigeria in 1842.
 Atlantic Slave Route/Port [Badagry – Marina and Gberefu Beach].
 Badagry Museum [Old British District Officer’s Building], Marina, Badagry.
 Early Missionaries’ Cemetery [1845], Hospital Road, Ahovikoh Quarters, Badagry.
 Eko University of Medicine and Health Sciences is located in Badagry Division.
 First Storey Building in Nigeria, – constructed by the CMS [Anglican Mission] in 1845.
 Lagos State University, [LASU], Ojo.
 Nigeria-Benin Republic International Border, Seme, Badagry.
 Nigeria-French Language Village, Badagry, Inter-University Centre for French Language Studies
 Ologe Forest Reserve, Ologe, Oto Awori Town, off Badagry Expressway
 Lagos State University of Education, [LASUED], Oto  Awori.
 Ogu Stately Drums [Sato] introduced in 1543 – Akarakumo
 Ogu Toplisen Shrine, Hunto Quarters, Badagry – where Badagry Monarchs [Aholu] are crowned.
 Palace of De Wheno Aholu [King] Menu Toyi 1, Akran of Badagry, Jegba Quarters.
 Relics of Slave Trade, Badagry-Mobee Compound, Seriki Abass Slave Barraccoon [1847]; Boeko, Boekoh Quarters, Vlekete Slave Market, Posukoh Quarters – Badagry where the Lander Brothers were tried in 1825.
 Tomb of George Fremingo, [1620] alias Huntokonu, first slave merchant in Badagry
 Trade Fair Complex, Ojo [site of annual Lagos International Trade Fair].
 Whispering Palms [Recreation Resort], Iworo.

Gallery

References

External links
 Lagos State Website

Populated places in Lagos State